The Willard Asylum for the Chronic Insane is a former state hospital in Willard, New York, near Seneca Lake. 

The Willard drug treatment center was opened in 1995 on the campus of the former Willard Psychiatric State Hospital, a facility for mental patients.

In 1995, some 400 suitcases that were brought in by the patients were discovered in an asylum attic.

References

External links

Willard Asylum for the Insane at Abandoned
Willard State Hospital at Asylum Projects
Willard State Hospital at NYSAsylum

Hospital buildings completed in 1869
Government buildings on the National Register of Historic Places in New York (state)
Psychiatric hospitals in New York (state)
Buildings and structures in Seneca County, New York
1869 establishments in New York (state)
National Register of Historic Places in Seneca County, New York